Piriformis syndrome is a condition which is believed to result from compression of the sciatic nerve by the piriformis muscle. Symptoms may include pain and numbness in the buttocks and down the leg. Often symptoms are worsened with sitting or running.

Causes may include trauma to the gluteal muscle, spasms of the piriformis muscle, anatomical variation, or an overuse injury. Few cases in athletics, however, have been described. Diagnosis is difficult as there is no definitive test. A number of physical exam maneuvers can be supportive. Medical imaging is typically normal. Other conditions that may present similarly include a herniated disc.

Treatment may include avoiding activities that cause symptoms, stretching, physiotherapy, and medication such as NSAIDs. Steroid or botulinum toxin injections may be used in those who do not improve. Surgery is not typically recommended. The frequency of the condition is unknown, with different groups arguing it is more or less common.

Signs and symptoms
The signs and symptoms include gluteal pain that may radiate down buttock and the leg, and that is made worse in some sitting positions.

Etiology
Causes of piriformis syndrome include the following
Anatomic anomalies, present since birth:

 Bipartite piriformis muscle

 Sciatic nerve course/branching variations with respect to the piriformis muscle: In over 80% of the population, the sciatic nerve courses deep to and exits inferiorly to the piriformis muscle belly/tendon. Early (proximal) divisions of the sciatic nerve into its tibial and common peroneal components can predispose patients to piriformis syndrome, with these branches passing through and below the piriformis muscle or above and below the muscle.

Acquired

 Sitting for prolonged periods (office workers, taxi drivers, bicycle riders)

 Overuse syndromes: Piriformis muscle hypertrophy (viz., in athletes)

 Trauma to the hip or buttock area

Pathophysiology
When the piriformis muscle shortens or spasms due to trauma or overuse, it can compress or strangle the sciatic nerve beneath the muscle. Generally, conditions of this type are referred to as nerve entrapment or as entrapment neuropathies; the particular condition known as piriformis syndrome refers to sciatica symptoms not originating from spinal roots and/or spinal disc compression, but involving the overlying piriformis muscle.

In 17% of an assumed normal population the sciatic nerve passes through the piriformis muscle, rather than underneath it; however, in patients undergoing surgery for suspected piriformis syndrome such an anomaly was found only 16.2% of the time leading to doubt about the importance of the anomaly as a factor in piriformis syndrome. Some researchers discount the importance of this relationship in the etiology of the syndrome.

MRI findings have shown that both hypertrophy (unusual largeness) and atrophy (unusual smallness) of the piriformis muscle correlate with the supposed condition.

Piriformis syndrome may also be associated with direct trauma to the piriformis muscle, such as in a fall or from a knife wound.

Diagnosis
Piriformis syndrome occurs when the sciatic nerve is compressed or pinched by the piriformis muscle of the hip. It usually only affects one hip at a given time, though both hips may produce piriformis syndrome at some point in the patient's lifetime, and having had it once greatly increases the chance that it will recur in one hip or the other at some future point unless action is taken to prevent it. Indications include sciatica (radiating pain in the buttock, posterior thigh, and lower leg) and the physical exam finding of tenderness in the area of the sciatic notch. If the piriformis muscle can be located beneath the other gluteal muscles, it will feel noticeably cord-like and will be painful to compress or massage. The pain is exacerbated with any activity that causes flexion of the hip including lifting, prolonged sitting, or walking.

The diagnosis is largely clinical and is one of exclusion. During a physical examination, attempts may be made to stretch the irritated piriformis and provoke sciatic nerve compression, such as the Freiberg test, the Pace test, the FABER test (flexion, abduction, external rotation), and the FAIR test (flexion, adduction, internal rotation). Sciatica secondary to conditions to be ruled out include herniated nucleus pulposus (HNP), facet arthropathy, spinal stenosis, and lumbar muscle strain. Pathology in the sacroiliac joint region, Sacroiliac joint dysfunction and Sacroiliitis are other conditions that present with pain in the low back and hip regions, which may radiate down along the back of the thigh, rarely going down below knee.

Wallet neuritis is an extra-spinal tunnel neuropathy of sciatic nerve, occurring mostly in men. Sitting down on a thick Wallet in the back pocket produces uneven pressure in the hip region that impinges on the Piriformis muscle and / or sciatic nerve. Wallet induced chronic sciatic nerve constriction produces gluteal and ipsilateral lower extremity pain, tingling, and burning sensation.

Diagnostic modalities such as ultrasound Imaging, MRI, CT scan, and EMG are mostly useful in excluding other conditions. Increased thickness [iTh] and increased cross‐sectional area [iCSA] for piriformis muscle may be demonstrated on ultrasound imaging and MRI.

Magnetic resonance neurography is a medical imaging technique that can show the presence of irritation of the sciatic nerve at the level of the sciatic notch where the nerve passes under the piriformis muscle. However, Magnetic resonance neurography is considered "investigational/not medically necessary" by some insurance companies. Neurography can determine whether or not a patient has a split sciatic nerve or a split piriformis muscle – this may be important in getting a good result from injections or surgery. Image guided injections carried out in an open MRI scanner, or other 3D image guidance can accurately relax the piriformis muscle to test the diagnosis. Other injection methods such as blind injection, fluoroscopic guided injection, ultrasound, or EMG guidance can work but are not as reliable and have other drawbacks.

Prevention
The most common etiology of piriformis syndrome is that resulting from a specific previous injury due to trauma. Large injuries include trauma to the buttocks while "micro traumas" result from small repeated bouts of stress on the piriformis muscle itself. To the extent that piriformis syndrome is the result of some type of trauma and not neuropathy, such secondary causes are considered preventable, especially those occurring in daily activities: according to this theory, periods of prolonged sitting, especially on hard surfaces, produce minor stress that can be relieved with bouts of standing. An individual's environment, including lifestyle factors and physical activity, determine susceptibility to trauma of any given type. Although empirical research findings on the subject have never been published, many believe that taking sensible precautions during high-impact sports and when working in physically demanding conditions may decrease the risk of experiencing piriformis syndrome, either by forestalling injury to the muscle itself or injury to the nerve root that causes it to spasm. In this vein, proper safety and padded equipment should be worn for protection during any type of regular, firm contact (i.e., American football, etc.). In the workplace, individuals are encouraged to make regular assessments of their surroundings and attempt to recognize those things in one's routine that might produce micro or macro traumas. No research has substantiated the effectiveness of any such routine, however, and participation in one may do nothing but heighten an individual's sense of worry over physical minutiae while have no effect in reducing the likeliness of experiencing or re-experiencing piriformis syndrome.

Other suggestions from some researchers and physical therapists have included prevention strategies include warming up before physical activity, practicing correct exercise form, stretching, and doing strength training, though these are often suggested for helping treat or prevent any physical injury and are not piriformis-specific in their approach As with any type of exercise, it is thought that warmups will decrease the risk of injury during flexion or rotation of the hip. Stretching increases range of motion, while strengthening hip adductors and abductors theoretically allows the piriformis to tolerate trauma more readily.

Treatment
Immediate though temporary relief of piriformis syndrome can usually be brought about by injection of a local anaesthetic into the piriformis muscle. Symptomatic relief of muscle and nerve pain can also sometimes be obtained by nonsteroidal anti-inflammatory drugs and/or muscle relaxants, though the use of such medication or even more powerful prescription medication for relief of sciatica is often assessed by patients to be largely ineffective at relieving pain. Conservative treatment usually begins with stretching exercises, myofascial release, massage, and avoidance of contributory activities such as running, bicycling, rowing, heavy lifting, etc. Some clinicians recommend formal physical therapy, including soft tissue mobilization, hip joint mobilization, teaching stretching techniques, and strengthening of the gluteus maximus, gluteus medius, and biceps femoris to reduce strain on the piriformis. More advanced physical therapy treatment can include pelvic-trochanter isometric stretching, hip abductor, external rotator and extensor strengthening exercises, transcutaneous electrical nerve stimulation (TENS), and massage physiotherapy of the piriformis muscle region. One study of 14 people with what appeared to be piriformis syndrome indicated that rehabilitation programs that included physical therapy, low doses of muscle relaxants and pain relief medication were effective at alleviating most muscle and nerve pain caused by what the research subjects had been told was piriformis syndrome. However, as this study included very few individuals and did not have a control group not receiving treatment (both serious methodological flaws), it provides no insight as to whether the pain in the piriformis would have simply dissipated on its own without any treatment at all, and is therefore not only uninformative, it may actually be misleading. The injury is considered largely self-limiting and spontaneous recovery is usually on the order of a few days or a week to six weeks or longer if left untreated.

Stretching
Most practitioners agree that spasm, strain, or pain in any muscle can often be treated by regular stretching exercise of that muscle, no matter the cause of the pain. Stretching is recommended every two to three waking hours. Anterior and posterior movement of the hip joint capsule may help optimize the patient's stretching capacity. The muscle can be manually stretched by applying pressure perpendicular to the long axis of the muscle and parallel to the surface of the buttocks until the muscle is relaxed. Another stretching exercise is to lie on the side opposite of the pain with the hip and knee of the upper leg flexed and adducted towards the ground while the torso is rotated so that the back of the upper shoulder touches the ground. Physical Therapists may suggest stretching exercises that will target the piriformis, but may also include the hamstrings and hip muscles in order to adequately reduce pain and increase range of motion. Patients with piriformis syndrome may also find relief from applications of ice which will help reduce inflammation and so may help limit pressure on the sciatic nerve. This treatment can be helpful when pain starts or immediately after an activity that is likely to cause pain. As the length of time progresses, heat may provide temporary relief from many types of muscle pain and will temporarily increase muscle flexibility.

Local injections

Failure of conservative treatments such as stretching and strengthening of the piriformis muscle or a high level of immediate pain intensity may bring into consideration various therapeutic injections such as local anesthetics (e.g., lidocaine), anti-inflammatory drugs and/or corticosteroids, botulinum toxin (BTX, Botox), or a combination of the three, all of which have a well-documented effectiveness at relieving muscle-related pain. Injection technique is a significant issue since the piriformis is a very deep-seated muscle. A radiologist may assist in this clinical setting by injecting a small dose of medication containing a paralysing agent such as botulinum toxin under high-frequency ultrasound or CT control. This inactivates the piriformis muscle for 3 to 6 months, without resulting in leg weakness or impaired activity. Though the piriformis muscle becomes inactivated, the surrounding muscles quickly take over its role without any noticeable change in strength or gait. Such treatments may be more or less curative (with no return to pain), or may have limited timespans of effectiveness.

Surgery
For rare cases with unrelenting chronic pain, surgery may be recommended. Surgical release of the piriformis muscle is often effective. Minimal access surgery using newly reported techniques has also proven successful in a large-scale formal outcome published in 2005. As with injections, the deactivated/ excised muscle's role in leg movement is completely compensated for by surrounding hip muscles.

Failure of piriformis syndrome treatment may be secondary to an underlying internal obturator muscle injury.

Epidemiology

Piriformis syndrome (PS) data is often confused with other conditions due to differences in definitions, survey methods and whether or not occupational groups or general population are surveyed. This causes a lack of group harmony about the diagnosis and treatment of PS, affecting its epidemiology. In a study, 0.33% of 1293 patients with low back pain cited an incident for PS. A separate study showed 6% of 750 patients with the same incidence. About 6–8% of low back pain occurrences were attributed to PS, though other reports concluded about 5–36%. In a survey conducted on the general population, 12.2–27% included a lifetime occurrence of PS, while 2.2–19.5% showed an annual occurrence. However further studies show that the proportion of the sciatica, in terms of PS, is about 0.1% in orthopaedic practice. This is more common in women with a ratio of 3 to 1 and most likely due to the wider quadriceps femoris muscle angle in the os coxae. Between the years of 1991–1994, PS was found to be 75% prevalent in New York, Connecticut, New Jersey, Pennsylvania; 20% in other American urban centers; and 5% in North and South America, Europe, Asia, Africa and Australia. The common ages of occurrence happen between thirty and forty, and are scarcely found in patients younger than twenty; this has been known to affect all lifestyles.

Piriformis syndrome is often left undiagnosed and mistaken with other pains due to similar symptoms with back pain, quadriceps pain, lower leg pain, and buttock pain. These symptoms include tenderness, tingling and numbness initiating in low back and buttock area and then radiating down to the thigh and to the leg.
A precise test for piriformis syndrome has not yet been developed and thus hard to diagnose this pain.
The pain is often initiated by sitting and walking for a longer period.
In 2012, 17.2% of low back pain patients developed piriformis syndrome.
Piriformis syndrome does not occur in children, and is mostly seen in women of age between thirty and forty. This is due to hormone changes throughout their life, especially during pregnancy, where muscles around the pelvis, including piriformis muscles, tense up to stabilize the area for birth.
In 2011, out of 263 patients between the ages of 45 to 84 treated for piriformis syndrome, 53.3% were female. Females are two times more likely to develop piriformis syndrome than males. Moreover, females had longer stay in hospital during 2011 due to high prevalence of the pain in females. The average cost of treatment was $29,070 for hospitalizing average 4 days.

References

Further reading

External links

Musculoskeletal disorders
Peripheral nervous system disorders
Wikipedia medicine articles ready to translate
Syndromes